Dubrava is a rural locality (a selo) in Simskoye Rural Settlement, Yuryev-Polsky District, Vladimir Oblast, Russia. The population was 10 as of 2010.

Geography 
Dubrava is located 8 km north from Sima, 30 km north of Yuryev-Polsky (the district's administrative centre) by road. Teslovo is the nearest rural locality.

References 

Rural localities in Yuryev-Polsky District